Raymond Laflamme (born 1960), OC, FRSC is a Canadian theoretical physicist and founder and until mid 2017, was the director of the Institute for Quantum Computing at the University of Waterloo. He is also a professor in the Department of Physics and Astronomy at the University of Waterloo and an associate faculty member at Perimeter Institute for Theoretical Physics. Laflamme is currently a Canada Research Chair in Quantum Information. In December 2017, he was named as one of the appointees to the Order of Canada.

As Stephen Hawking's PhD student, he first became famous for convincing Hawking that time does not reverse in a contracting universe, along with  Don Page. Hawking told the story of how this happened in his famous book A Brief History of Time in the chapter The Arrow of Time. Later on Laflamme made a name for himself in quantum computing and quantum information theory, which is what he is famous for today. In 2005, Laflamme's research group created the world's largest quantum information processor with 12 qubits. Along with Phillip Kaye and Michele Mosca, he published the book An Introduction to Quantum Computing in 2006.

Laflamme's research focuses on understanding the impact of manipulating information using the laws of quantum mechanics, the development of methods to protect quantum information against noise through quantum control and quantum error correction for quantum computing and cryptography, the implementation of ideas and concepts of quantum information processing using nuclear magnetic resonance to develop scalable methods of control of quantum systems, and the development of blueprints for quantum information processors such as linear optical quantum computing.

Biography
Laflamme was born in Quebec City in 1960 to a medical doctor father and a dietician mother. He finished his undergraduate education at the Universite Laval in Canada and went on to study at the Department of Applied Mathematics and Theoretical Physics at the University of Cambridge where he received the Part III of Math. Tripos degree in 1984. Subsequently, his PhD supervisor was Stephen Hawking. Hawking has mentioned in his book A Brief History of Time that Laflamme and Don Page were responsible for convincing him that time does not reverse in a contracting universe. Hawking inscribed a copy of the book as follows: "To Raymond, who showed me that the arrow of time is not a boomerang. Thank you for all your help. Stephen."

After completing his PhD, Laflamme worked as a Killam postdoctoral fellow at the University of British Columbia and in 1990, moved back to Cambridge as a Research Fellow at Peterhouse, Cambridge. Laflamme subsequently joined the Los Alamos National Laboratory where he was an Oppenheimer Fellow. His work during over nine years at the Lab was ranked amongst the Top Ten Breakthroughs of the Year from the journal Science in 1998. In 2001, he joined the newly founded Perimeter Institute for Theoretical Physics and the Physics and Astronomy department of the affiliated University of Waterloo, where he founded the Institute for Quantum Computing in 2002.

In 2003, he became director of the Quantum Information program at the Canadian Institute for Advanced Research; he is also the scientific director of QuantumWorks, Canada's national research consortium on Quantum Information Science, and holds the Canada Research Chair in Quantum Information.

In June 2017, Laflamme stepped down as director at the Institute for Quantum Computing and in September 2017, he was appointed as the "John von Neumann" Chair in Quantum Information at the University of Waterloo, continuing his research on error correction in quantum systems. Laflamme continued to hold a Canada Research Chair and a position as Associate Faculty at Perimeter Institute.

Scientific work
Though he started his career working in quantum gravity and cosmology, Raymond Laflamme is known as a pioneering scientist in quantum information theory. While at Los Alamos, he was involved with the experimental implementation of quantum information processing devices using nuclear magnetic resonance. He is also credited with developing a theoretical scheme for efficient quantum computation using linear optics, along with Emanuel Knill and Gerard J. Milburn. 
Laflamme laid down the mathematical framework for quantum error-correcting codes, which has since developed into a broad topic of research.  With colleagues Cesar Miquel, Juan Pablo Paz and Wojciech Zurek, he constructed the most compact quantum error correcting code.

In a 2013 interview, Laflamme described the importance of his work as follows. "Quantum information is going to change your life. And the one of your kids. And the one of your grandkids. And this is what I want to see. And this is what I expect to see: before I pass away, I will see that this quantum revolution is in full swing."

Honours

 Fellow of the Royal Society of Canada in 2008
 Canadian Premier's Discovery Award in the field of Natural Sciences and Engineering in 2008 
 Fellow of the American Physical Society in 2011
 Fellow of the American Association for the Advancement of Science in 2011
 Honorary Degree from Université de Sherbrooke in 2012
 Queen Elizabeth II Golden Jubilee Medal in 2013
 Awarded the CAP-CRM Prize in Theoretical and Mathematical Physics in 2017.
 Appointed to the Order of Canada in 2017 "for his outstanding achievements as an administrator and researcher who has advanced quantum science and technology in Canada"; the ceremony was scheduled for 2018.

Media appearances
Laflamme was a featured scientist in the award-winning documentary, "The Quantum Tamers" which was presented by the Perimeter Institute and saw its Canadian premiere in October 2009 at the Quantum to Cosmos festival in Waterloo, Ontario. Laflamme was also a participant in The Agenda With Steve Paikin discussion panel, "Wired 24/7",  with Neil Gershenfeld, Jaron Lanier, Neal Stephenson, and Tara Hunt at the Quantum to Cosmos festival. The following year, Laflamme was a contributor at the 2010 TEDx event in Waterloo, Ontario.

Laflamme was involved in several events surrounding the grand-opening of the Mike & Ophelia Lazaridis Quantum-Nano Centre at the University of Waterloo. He was a participant at the "Bridging Worlds" panel discussion with Ivan Semeniuk, Mike Lazaridis, Tom Brzustowski, and Chad Orzel at the Mike & Ophelia Lazaridis Quantum-Nano Centre Open House in 2012. As part of the grand-opening events, the Kitchener-Waterloo Symphony performed "Quantum: Music at the Frontier of Science" of which Laflamme was a collaborator in the creation of the concert narrative.

Laflamme appeared as a speaker at BrainSTEM: Your Future is Now Festival which is running from September 30 to October 6, 2013.

References

External links
IQC profile: Raymond Laflamme
The Agenda With Steve Paikin: Wired 24/7?
TEDxWaterloo: Raymond Laflamme
Oxford University Press Catalog: An Introduction to Quantum Computing

Canada Research Chairs
Living people
1960 births
People from Quebec City
Academic staff of the University of Waterloo
Fellows of the Royal Society of Canada
Officers of the Order of Canada
Canadian physicists
Quantum information scientists
Quantum physicists
Fellows of the American Physical Society